University of Austin (UATX) is a proposed American private liberal arts college. Announced in 2021, it is to be located in Austin, Texas. , the venture was reliant on a fiscal sponsor and was seeking  accreditation in the process of securing a site in the Austin area for its campus.

History
The proposal for a University of Austin was first publicized on November 8, 2021 in an article by founding president Pano Kanelos, formerly the president of St. John's College, in journalist Bari Weiss's Substack newsletter Common Sense. 

Days after the venture's launch was announced, UATX advisor Stacy Hock said that UATX had so far received over 3,000 inquiries from potential faculty, and that student inquiry had been overwhelming.

Academics
The founding faculty fellows include Peter Boghossian, Ayaan Hirsi Ali, and Kathleen Stock. Other founders include former Harvard President Lawrence Summers, former ACLU President Nadine Strossen, and former president of the American Enterprise Institute Arthur Brooks.

In November 2021, the university's website listed Robert Zimmer, Larry Summers, John Nunes, Gordon Gee, Steven Pinker, Deirdre McCloskey, Leon Kass, Jonathan Haidt, Glenn Loury, Joshua Katz, Vickie Sullivan, Geoffrey Stone, Bill McClay, and Tyler Cowen as being affiliated with the university.

Writing in The Week, Samuel Goldman observed that no prominent members of the board of advisors had yet resigned their academic appointments to join the University of Austin faculty, suggesting that their "lack of personal commitment casts doubt on the value of their support." Kathleen Stock clarified that her role was not full-time, and that she would not move to Austin. Harvard University professor Steven Pinker said that although he was part of the advisory board, he had no plans to teach there; he later resigned from the board. West Virginia University president Gordon Gee said "Serving in an advisory capacity does not mean I believe or agree with everything that other advisers may share. I do not agree other universities are no longer seeking the truth nor do I feel that higher education is irreparably broken."

On November 11, 2021, Robert Zimmer announced his resignation from the UATX board, saying that UATX had made statements about higher education that "diverged very significantly from my own views". UATX put out a statement on Steven Pinker resigning from the board, and apologized for creating "unnecessary complications" for Pinker and Zimmer due to UATX not initially clarifying what their advisory roles entailed on the venture's website.

According to its website, the proposed college plans to begin to accept graduate students in 2022 and undergraduate students in 2024. As of 2021, the institution did not formally exist, but the proposers report that they are seeking accreditation through the Higher Learning Commission, an accreditor recognized by the United States Department of Education and authorized by the Texas Higher Education Coordinating Board.

On June 9, 2022, the University of Austin was taking applications for its "Forbidden Courses" program with two-week-long sessions in the old (pre-1954) Parkland Memorial Hospital in Dallas, Texas.

Mission
The proposal for a University of Austin was described by Gabriella Swerling in The Daily Telegraph as "anti-cancel culture" and by Alex Shephard in The New Republic as "anti-woke". Statements by its proponents described UATX as devoted to academic freedom.

The project reportedly raised US$10 million in private donations in the two months prior to launching, and aims to raise $250 million to launch the undergraduate and graduate program during the initial few years. The proposers declared that they would not factor race, gender, or class into admissions because they "stand(s) firmly against that sort of discrimination".

Reception
Initial responses to the project included criticism of the lack of a plan to achieve the project's goals. The New York Times journalist Anemona Hartocollis questioned whether the founders would be able to "translate a provocative idea into a viable institution" while The New Republics Alex Shephard described the plan as "largely half baked". Jennifer Wunder, a professor at Georgia Gwinnett College who participated in the process of obtaining her institution's initial accreditation, considered the proposed timeline to establish accredited graduate and undergraduate programs to be nearly impossible to meet.

Writing in The Washington Post, political scientist Daniel W. Drezner believed it was a challenge trying to recruit graduate students by fall 2022 with no "admissions staff...to gin up that process". The New York Times opinion columnist Ross Douthat saw the launch of a new university as a positive development, pointing out how few major universities have been established since the nineteenth century, but acknowledged how expensive doing so would be. He also saw conflicting forces in the project, including the "tension between the desire to promote great academic seriousness and the culture-war flag-waving that might be necessary to rally donor support". 

The project drew "withering criticism" on social media, including tweets by Weiss's former colleague Nikole Hannah-Jones who, along with others, drew comparisons with Trump University. Writing in The Washington Post, political scientist Daniel W. Drezner called comparisons between UATX and Trump University "unkind and untrue". John Warner at Inside Higher Ed said "I think it is unfair to call it a scam or grift, because I have high confidence that the intentions behind the project are sincere."

The University of Austin has been described by British media as "anti-cancel culture" and "anti-woke".

References

Further reading

 Niall Ferguson: "I’m Helping to Start a New College Because Higher Ed Is Broken", The Washington Post, Nov. 8, 2021

Education in Austin, Texas
Organizations based in Austin, Texas
2021 establishments in Texas